John Victor McSorley (born 1941), is a male former athlete who competed for England.

Athletics career
He represented England in the hammer, javelin and shot put at the 1962 British Empire and Commonwealth Games in Perth, Western Australia.

Eight years later he won silver medal in the javelin at the 1970 British Commonwealth Games in Edinburgh, Scotland.

Association with Reg Spiers
In 1964, fellow javelin thrower Reg Spiers, air-freighted himself from England to Australia to avoid paying for the flight. John McSorley created the box for his friend and when he did not hear from Spiers, he became worried and contacted the press about the incident.  McSorely's wife and son later wrote a book discussing this incident.

References

1941 births
English male hammer throwers
Commonwealth Games medallists in athletics
Commonwealth Games silver medallists for England
Athletes (track and field) at the 1962 British Empire and Commonwealth Games
Athletes (track and field) at the 1970 British Commonwealth Games
Living people
English male javelin throwers
English male shot putters
Medallists at the 1970 British Commonwealth Games